The December 2009 North American blizzard was a powerful nor'easter that formed over the Gulf of Mexico in December 2009, and became a major snowstorm that affected the East Coast of the United States and Canadian Atlantic provinces. The snowstorm brought record-breaking December snowfall totals to Washington, D.C., Baltimore, and Philadelphia.

The blizzard disrupted several regions, and in some areas the snowfall rate prevented snow plows from maintaining the roads. The blizzard caused flights and trains to be canceled, and left areas without power. Kentucky, Maryland, Virginia, West Virginia, and New Castle and Kent counties in Delaware declared a state of emergency. Seven deaths were reported to have been caused by the storm.

Meteorological history
On December 16, 2009, meteorologists identified a storm forming in the Gulf of Mexico. It produced record rainfall in regions of Texas and had the potential to strengthen as it moved through Georgia and Florida and further north. Weather models accurately predicted that this storm would meet with cold air while retaining its heavy precipitation. By the afternoon of December 19, the large, low pressure region had moved off the East Coast, intensifying and bringing heavy snow to the major Mid-Atlantic cities. Blizzard warnings were issued in Washington, D.C., Baltimore, and Long Island.

Snowfall
Interior areas of West Virginia saw  of snow. The storm broke the record for the amount of snow in a single December event at Ronald Reagan Washington National Airport, where  of snow accumulated. The National Weather Service in Brookhaven, New York reported  of snow, the town's largest snowfall since 1949.

By Sunday, December 20,  of snowfall had accumulated in Philadelphia, surpassing the city's second-largest record  snowfall of February 11–12, 1983 – which itself was surpassed less than two months later by the February 5–6, 2010 North American blizzard. The storm also broke a 100-year-old record for the largest single December storm, previously  on December 25–26, 1909. The storm was reported by meteorologists to share attributes of the 1983 storm.

In more mountainous areas, snowfall was even heavier. In the Roanoke Valley, over  had fallen by midnight.

Winter storm warnings for New York and a blizzard warning for Long Island expired at 11 a.m. Sunday, warnings for the Boston and Providence metro areas and much of southeastern New England expired at noon. A blizzard warning for Cape Cod expired at 1 p.m. Portions of Newfoundland and Labrador received freezing rain as well.

Snowfall Totals By State

Impact

Ronald Reagan Washington National Airport, Washington Dulles International Airport, and Baltimore/Washington International Thurgood Marshall Airport saw whiteout conditions, causing flights to be delayed or canceled. Of 740 scheduled departures at Washington National and 530 at Dulles, only 14 and 12, respectively, were able to take off. President Barack Obama, arriving at Andrews Air Force Base after the UN Climate Conference, was forced to return to the White House by motorcade instead of helicopter. More than 800 flights were canceled at New York City's three major airports.

Many Amtrak trains were also canceled or delayed and service on Washington, D.C.'s Metrorail was suspended to all outdoor stations at 1 pm on December 19 and remained suspended until late in the day December 20; underground service remained operational. One Amtrak train, carrying 255 passengers, halted for six hours while a frozen track switch was fixed.

On roads, snow plows were unable to keep up with fast snow accumulations. Road accidents and stuck vehicles further hindered snow removal. On some major highways, traffic slowed to five miles per hour. In West Virginia, on I-77 between Ghent and Beckley, thousands of motorists were stranded for up to 18 hours due to impassable roads.  The interstate was closed for 15 hours.  Governor Joe Manchin has launched a full investigation into why the roads were in such poor condition. Greyhound Lines canceled 294 routes through Maryland, Virginia, Washington, D.C., and West Virginia on December 19 and suspended service in and out of New York late Saturday.

Thousands of power outages were reported in Virginia, Kentucky, and North Carolina, reportedly caused by snow weighing down on power lines. By midnight Saturday morning, when the storm had just begun to strike the area, reported power outages had already exceeded 40,000. In Kentucky, 107,000 power outages were reported. A snow emergency was declared in Washington, D.C., where Mayor Adrian Fenty asked residents to avoid venturing onto the roads. States of emergency were declared in Kentucky, Maryland, Virginia, West Virginia and New Castle and Kent counties in Delaware.

The storm was held responsible for seven deaths in North Carolina, Ohio, Pennsylvania, Virginia, and West Virginia, including one death resulting from a head-on collision between a snowmobile driver and a horse-drawn carriage.

The nor'easter, which arrived on the last weekend before Christmas, hurt sales at retail stores in affected regions, but boosted online sales. Super Saturday, the last Saturday before Christmas, typically nets $15 billion in retail sales. It is estimated that 30% of this revenue comes from the northeastern United States. Stores that managed to open saw reduced traffic. The storm resulted in an estimated loss of $2 billion in retail sales.

Due to widespread accumulation of heavy snow, the storm was ranked as a high-end Category 2 ("significant") winter storm, on the Northeast Snowfall Impact Scale. The ranking is based on the amount of snowfall, the area, and the population affected.

New Jersey 

New Jersey's major towns and cities were particularly hard hit with snow and some rain coming onshore. During the day, rain inundated the coastline as temperatures were not cold enough for snow. Around 5 P.M, heavy snow pushed the rain offshore, making for blizzard conditions along the coast. In New Jersey, anywhere from 2 to 20 inches of snow fell. During the height of the storm, power was knocked out in places from Paterson, New Jersey to Cape May, New Jersey.

New York 

New York City was put under a blizzard warning during the height of the storm. Winds of up to  knocked out power in the New York City metropolitan area. Nearby towns in New Jersey and on Long Island experienced the brunt of the storm along with New York City.

Florida

The same system produced severe weather in Florida. Four EF0 tornadoes touched down in the state, causing mostly minor damage.

See also

List of Regional Snowfall Index Category 4 winter storms
List of NESIS storms
2009 North American Christmas blizzard
February 5–6, 2010 North American blizzard
February 9–10, 2010 North American blizzard
February 25–27, 2010 North American blizzard
December 2010 North American blizzard
January 2016 United States blizzard
Winter of 2009–2010 in Europe
Winter storms of 2009–2010
Winter storms of 2009–2010 in East Asia

References

External links

 "Washington's winter wallop", photo gallery by The Washington Post
 "Storm Goes Northeast With Its Snowy Blanket", photo gallery by The New York Times

2009-12
2009 North American blizzard, December
Nor'easters
2009 meteorology
2009 natural disasters in the United States
2009 disasters in Canada
Natural disasters in Delaware
Natural disasters in Kentucky
Natural disasters in Maryland
Natural disasters in New Jersey
Natural disasters in New York (state)
Natural disasters in Virginia
Natural disasters in Washington, D.C.
Natural disasters in West Virginia
2009–10 North American winter
December 2009 events in North America